The women's 7.5 kilometre + 7.5 kilometre double pursuit cross-country skiing competition at the 2010 Winter Olympics in Vancouver, Canada was held on 19 February at Whistler Olympic Park in Whistler, British Columbia at 13:00 PST.

The 15 km double pursuit format has been competed at the world championship level since 2005 and at the Winter Olympic level since 2006. Estonia's Kristina Šmigun-Vähi was the defending Olympic champion. Poland's Justyna Kowalczyk was the defending world champion. Kowalczyk also won the test event that took place at the Olympic venue on 17 January 2009. The last World Cup event prior to the 2010 Games in this format took place on 23 January 2010 in Rybinsk, Russia and was won by Kowalczyk.

The pursuit consisted of a 7.5 kilometre section raced in the classical style, followed by a 7.5 kilometre portion raced freestyle. In between the sections, each skier takes time (approximately 30 seconds) to change skis and poles in a pit stop.

Results
Leaders after the classical portion were Finland's Saarinen (who finished fifth), Bjørgen, and Kowalczyk. Pit stop leaders were tied for first with Saarinen and Italy's Follis (who finished ninth), and Finland's Roponen (who finished 15th). Kowalczyk edged out Størmer Steira in a photo finish in the bronze. For Størmer Steira, it became the fourth fourth-place finish in the Olympics (following three fourth places in 2006), and she again failed to win a medal. (She became on Olympic champion in the relay several days later). Defending Olympic champion Smigun-Vähi dropped out during the classical portion of the event.

References

External links
2010 Winter Olympics results: Ladies' 15 km Pursuit (7.5 Classic+7.5 Free), from https://web.archive.org/web/20100222080013/http://www.vancouver2010.com/ retrieved 2010-02-18.

Women's cross-country skiing at the 2010 Winter Olympics
Women's pursuit cross-country skiing at the Winter Olympics